Tomoe Hotta (born 16 April 1975) is a Japanese former professional tennis player.

Hotta reached a best singles ranking of 240 in the world, with two ITF title wins. She featured in the doubles main draw in three editions of the Japan Open and won eight ITF doubles tournaments.

ITF finals

Singles: 8 (2–6)

Doubles: 18 (8–10)

References

External links
 
 

1975 births
Living people
Japanese female tennis players
20th-century Japanese women
21st-century Japanese women